Wellington Leal Dias Santos, known by his nickname Megaton, is a Brazilian jiu-jitsu (BJJ) practitioner, and 7th degree coral belt of the Gracie Humaitá jiu-jitsu association under Royler Gracie. Wellington originally trained under Rogerio Camoes and later at the Gracie Humaitá jiu-jitsu school in Rio de Janeiro. Wellington received his black belt at the age of 18. Wellington is currently a seventh degree coral belt under Royler Gracie.

Wellington is a multiple Pan-American medalist, European medalist, Worlds medalist, US National medalist, Rickson Gracie International Championship medalist, Rio de Janeiro State Champion and ADCC veteran.

He is the only Brazilian jiu-jitsu competitor to have competed in all 24 World Jiu-Jitsu Championships,  since  the first competition in 1996. He still competed in adult black belt divisions of smaller IBJJF tournaments well into his 50s, even earning gold medals against adult competitors as recently as 2023.

Wellington Dias resides in Phoenix, Arizona where he directs the Megaton Brazilian Jiu-Jitsu Academy, the first BJJ academy in Arizona. Megaton has trained in judo and BJJ since 1976. His wife Luciana and daughter Mackenzie Dern are also black belts in the discipline, under his tutelage.

Dias is nicknamed "Megaton" because of his judo training and propensity to launch his competitors high into the air, similar to the blast of a nuclear bomb. "Megaton" was named the #1 ranked nickname in MMA by SubFighter in 2007.

Instructor lineage
Mitsuyo "Count Koma" Maeda → Carlos Gracie, Sr. → Helio Gracie → Royler Gracie → Wellington "Megaton" Dias

References

External links

 Official Website on Megaton Jujitsu Schools
 Blackbelt Megaton Chokes his competitor in France
 Live Coverage

Brazilian practitioners of Brazilian jiu-jitsu
People awarded a black belt in Brazilian jiu-jitsu
Brazilian male judoka
Living people
1967 births
Brazilian emigrants to the United States
Sportspeople from Rio de Janeiro (city)